The following television stations operate on virtual channel 33 in the United States:

 K08QN-D in Golden Valley, Arizona
 K25PZ-D in Alexandria, Louisiana
 K25QK-D in Anchorage, Alaska
 K31NR-D in Overton, Nevada
 K33EJ-D in Walla Walla, Washington
 K33HH-D in Redding, California
 K33IX-D in Rock Springs, Wyoming
 K33LF-D in Lewiston, Montana
 K33LN-D in Minneapolis, Minnesota
 K33MD-D in Yuma, Arizona
 K33MN-D in Jefferson City, Missouri
 K33QH-D in San Angelo, Texas
 K34LK-D in Beaumont, Texas
 KAJS-LD in Lincoln, Nebraska
 KBGU-LD in St. Louis, Missouri
 KBSE-LD in Boise, etc., Idaho
 KCPN-LD in Amarillo, Texas
 KCSO-LD in Sacramento, California
 KDAF in Dallas, Texas
 KDFX-CD in Indio/Palm Springs, California
 KDJT-CD in Salinas, California
 KDMD in Anchorage, Alaska
 KEGW-CD in Siloam Springs, Arkansas
 KEMY-LD in Eureka, California
 KGEW-LD in Port Arthur, Texas
 KGOF-LD in Fresno, California
 KHMF-LD in Fort Smith, Arkansas
 KHSB-LD in Steamboat Springs, Colorado
 KMMW-LD in Stockton, California
 KMSS-TV in Shreveport, Louisiana
 KMUM-CD in Sacramento, California
 KPKN-LD in Tyler, Texas
 KQCK in Cheyenne, Wyoming
 KQSX-LD in Cal - Oregon, California
 KQZY-LD in Victoria, Texas
 KRPC-LP in Rapid City, South Dakota
 KRTN-TV in Durango, Colorado
 KSCW-DT in Wichita, Kansas
 KSPR-LD in Springfield, Missouri
 KSUD-LD in Salt Lake City, Utah
 KTAS in San Luis Obispo, California
 KTVW-DT in Phoenix, Arizona
 KTXU-LD in West Lake Hills, Texas
 KVCW in Las Vegas, Nevada
 KVVB-LD in Lucerne Valley, California
 KWPX-TV in Bellevue, Washington
 KWRW-LD in Oklahoma City, Oklahoma
 W19DB-D in Franklin, North Carolina
 W20EK-D in Andrews, etc., North Carolina
 W20EU-D in Chambersburg, Pennsylvania
 W28EE-D in Canton, etc., North Carolina
 W29DE-D in Hayesville, North Carolina
 W31AN-D in Murphy, North Carolina
 W31DH-D in Franklin, etc., North Carolina
 W31EH-D in Springfield, Illinois
 W31EJ-D in Tutu, St Thomas, U.S. Virgin Islands
 W31EV-D in Wausau, Wisconsin
 W32FH-D in St. Petersburg, Florida
 W33CY-D in Anasco, Puerto Rico
 W33EB-D in Olive Hill, Tennessee
 W33EH-D in Black Mountain, North Carolina
 W33EU-D in Athens, Georgia
 W33EV-D in Valdosta, Georgia
 W34FE-D in Parkersburg, West Virginia
 W35CK-D in Highlands, North Carolina
 W35CO-D in Burnsville, North Carolina
 W35DV-D in Augusta, Georgia
 WBFS-TV in Miami, Florida
 WBGR-LD in Bangor/Dedham, Maine
 WCAC-LD in Lagrange, Georgia
 WETK in Burlington, Vermont
 WFBI-LD in South East Memphis, Tennessee
 WFRZ-LD in Montgomery, Alabama
 WFXV in Utica, New York
 WHBR in Pensacola, Florida
 WIRE-CD in Atlanta, Georgia
 WISE-TV in Fort Wayne, Indiana
 WITF-TV in Harrisburg, Pennsylvania
 WJGC-LD in Jacksonville, North Carolina
 WJLP in Middletown Township, New Jersey
 WJPM-TV in Florence, South Carolina
 WMPX-LD in Dennis, Massachusetts
 WNBD-LD in Grenada, Mississippi
 WOHO-CD in Holland, Michigan
 WOWZ-LD in Salisbury, Maryland
 WQDE-LD in Indianapolis, Indiana
 WQDT-LD in Lumberton, Mississippi
 WRME-LD in Chicago, Illinois
 WRUA in Fajardo, Puerto Rico
 WSES in Tuscaloosa, Alabama
 WTVZ-TV in Norfolk, Virginia
 WUJF-LD in Jacksonville, Florida
 WUNF-TV in Asheville, North Carolina
 WVLA-TV in Baton Rouge, Louisiana
 WVPB-TV in Huntington, West Virginia
 WXCK-LD in Chiefland, Florida
 WYTV in Youngstown, Ohio
 WZPA-LD in Philadelphia, Pennsylvania

The following stations, which are no longer licensed, formerly operated on virtual channel 33:
 K34PO-D in Billings, Montana
 KKOM-LD in Lufkin, Texas
 KMAS-LD in Denver, Colorado
 KSDI-LD in Fresno, California
 KTDS-LD in Ted's Place, Colorado
 W19DD-D in Brevard, North Carolina
 W42DF-D in Cashiers, North Carolina
 W46AX-D in Bryson City, North Carolina
 W47DM-D in Cullowhee, North Carolina
 WBXG-LD in Gainesville, Florida
 WUCU-LD in Evansville, Indiana

References

33 virtual